"Two Step For A Rainy Day" is a Jazz song, written and performed by Ross Mintzer from the album “The Interlochen Arts Academy Jazz Combo” a CD issued in 2005."Two Step For A Rainy Day" includes musicians from the Interlochen Center For The Arts

References

2005 songs
2005 singles